Nguyễn Minh Nhựt (born 28 March 1986) is a Vietnamese footballer who plays as a goalkeeper for V.League 2 club XSKT Cần Thơ

Minh Nhựt grabbed attention when in a game against TP Ho Chi Minh City on 19 February 2017 the referee awarded the opposing team a penalty in stoppage time of the game with the score tied at 2–2. In protest of the referee's decision Minh Nhựt made no attempt to save the resulting spot kick even turning his back to the penalty taker. Following that Minh Nhựt and the other Long An players made no attempt to stop TP Ho Chi Minh City from scoring another two goals in a match which ended 5–2.

References 

1986 births
Living people
Vietnamese footballers
Association football goalkeepers
V.League 1 players
Xuan Thanh Saigon Cement FC players
Hoang Anh Gia Lai FC players
Quang Nam FC players
Can Tho FC players